Jawahar Navodaya Vidyalayas (JNVs) is a system of central schools for talented students predominantly from rural areas in India, targeting gifted students who lack access to accelerated learning due to financial, social and rural disadvantages.

They are run by Navodaya Vidyalaya Samiti, Noida, an autonomous organization under the Department of School Education and Literacy, Ministry of Education (MoE),. JNVs are fully residential and co-educational schools affiliated to Central Board of Secondary Education (CBSE), with classes from VI to XII standard.

Budget for all the activities at JNVs are provided by the Ministry of Education, and it's free of cost for students during the first 3 years of stay, from class IX onwards a nominal fee of ₹600 per month is applicable.

JNVs exist all over India, with the exception of Tamil Nadu. As of 31 December 2022, 661 JNVs were running with about 2,87,568 students enrolled, out of which 2,51,430 (≈87%) were from rural areas. In 2022, JNVs were the top-ranked C.B.S.E. schools, having a pass percentage of 99.71% and 98.93% in 10th and 12th grades respectively.

History 
The idea of Jawahar Navodaya Vidyalayas conceived by former Prime Minister of India Rajiv Gandhi. The concept of opening a JNV in every district of India was born as a part of the National Policy on Education, 1986 with an aim of providing excellence coupled with social justice. Subsequently, Navodaya Vidyalaya Samiti (NVS) was registered as a society under the Societies Registration Act, 1860.

As per policy of the government, one JNV was to be established in each district of country. To start with, two Jawahar Navodaya Vidyalayas were established during 1985–86, at Jhajjar (Haryana) and Amravati (Maharashtra). As of the 2022-23 academic session, JNVs had been sanctioned for 638 districts. In addition, ten JNVs have been sanctioned in districts having a large population of ST population, ten in districts having a large concentration of SC population and 3 special JNVs in Manipur and Ratlam, bringing the total number of sanctioned JNVs to 661. Out of these 649 JNVs are functional.

Organisational structure
Navodaya Vidyalayas are run by the Navodaya Vidyalaya Samiti (NVS), an autonomous organisation under the Ministry of Education (MoE)(formerly the Ministry of Human Resource Development (MHRD) (1985–2020) ), Department of School Education and Literacy, Govt. of India. The Chairman of the Samiti is the Minister of Education.

The Samiti functions through the executive committee under the Chairmanship of the Minister of Education. The executive committee is responsible for the management of all affairs including allocation of funds to the Samiti and has the authority to exercise all powers of Samiti. It is assisted by two sub-committees, the Finance Committee and Academic Advisory Committee. The executive head of the administrative pyramid is the Commissioner who executes the policies laid down by the Samiti's executive committee. He/she is assisted at the Headquarters level by Joint Commissioners, Deputy Commissioners and Assistant Commissioners. The Samiti has established eight regional offices for the administration and monitoring of Navodaya Vidyalayas under their jurisdiction. These offices are headed by a deputy commissioner and assistant commissioners.

For each JNV, there is a Vidyalaya Advisory Committee for assistance on matters of academics, infrastructure and other general activities and a Vidyalaya Management Committee for budget preparation, selection of ad-hoc teachers and proper functioning of the school. Normally the district collector of the concerned district is the ex-officio chairman of school level committees with local educationists, public representatives and officers from the district as members. Some schools also have a Vidhyalaya Coordination Committee for looking after the performance of academics.

List of schools 

Total 661 functional residential schools have been sanctioned in 638 districts of India with some special case institutes. These are administrated by eight regional offices (see table below) with jurisdiction over different states and UTs.

Admission
Admission to Class VI of the JNVs requires qualification in the Jawahar Navodaya Vidyalaya Selection Test (JNVST), an entrance exam designed, developed and conducted by the CBSE. JNVST for Class VI is conducted annually throughout the country to select the 80 most meritorious students for each JNV. It is conducted in three phases per year, depending upon the session structure in the specific state or union territory. Candidates can apply for the test only once during their Class V. Competition in the entrance exam can be gauged from the fact that in JNVST 2021, a total of 2,41,7009 students appeared and 47,320 students were selected (i.e. approx 2% pass percentage) The test encompasses mental ability skills, mathematics, and regional language. The schools provide reservations as per NVS policy which encompasses reservation for ST and SC (but not OBC), at least 75% selection of students from rural areas, maximum 25% from urban areas, fixed 33% for female students and 3% for disabled candidates.

To compensate for attrition and optimally utilize seats, JNVST, developed by CBSE, is also conducted for admission to Class IX and lateral admissions, based on merit in Class X, are made for Class XI.

Academics at JNVs 
JNVs have classes from VI to XII standard. A particular JNV usually provides two streams among Science, Arts and Commerce for Class XI and XII. JNVs are known for their academic excellence, which can be attributed to their merit-based entrance test and unique climate provided for otherwise disadvantaged children, and which is further proven by their performance at board examinations. More than half of JNVs have been equipped with smart classes. These schools regularly organize science congresses and exhibitions to promote a research mindset.

Three-language formula 
To facilitate migration every JNV student learns three languages in class VI to Class IX. These languages are grouped into A Level, B-I Level and B-II Level. The pattern followed in different categories of states is as shown in the table below. However, CBSE mandates for children to study two languages only. Therefore, students of each category of states appear for A Level and B-I level languages at CBSE examinations.

Board results 
JNVs has consistently produced the best results in CBSE board examinations over the years. In 201516 results, JNVs had a pass percentage of, 98.87% in Class X board exams and 96.73% in Class XII board exams. The pass percentage for JNVs has been higher than independent private schools, government schools and even Kendriya Vidyalayas. Quality of performance in the Board examinations has been exemplary with an average score of about 75% in Grade 12th and 78% in class 10th, with more than 89% of students scoring First Division scores, in the Board Examinations 2019.

Science promotion activities 
Navodaya Vidyalaya Samiti provides various experiences leading to science promotion and motivation to students to select STEM as their career. Various activities under this include:
Children Science Congress, 
Participation in multiple academic contests/Challenges/Olympiads, 
visit Research Institutes, 
Tinkering Labs in schools, 
Environmental activities, 
Arranging International exposure to students, 
Enriched ICT support and 
Entrepreneurial skill training.

The annual Science Congress is organized annually in collaboration with research institutes and institutes of national importance at the regional level. Exhibitions are organized at school, cluster, regional and national level for physics, chemistry Biology and maths.

Smart classes 
Navodaya Vidyalayas in collaboration with Samsung India set up smart classes in 450 JNVs and 7 Navodaya Leadership Institutes from 2013 to 2019. A smart class is typically equipped with an interactive Smartboard, laptops/tablets, Wi-Fi connectivity and power backup. A smart class supplements regular lessons in mathematics, science social science, English, and Hindi to explain concepts in an engaging and interactive manner. Teachers are trained to use the equipment effectively.

Social and cultural life 
The social milieu of JNVs is defined by the mingling of different sections of society from various regions of India since these schools follow the affirmative action policy and have a policy for migration from different linguistic regions. Teachers, chosen from across the country, live on the same campus and interact with students on a 24X7 basis leading to a familial feeling.

Promotion of National Integration through Migration 
One of the important features of the JNV scheme is the Migration Programme wherein two linked JNVs of different linguistic categories exchange students between them. The aim of the exchange program is to "promote national integration and enrich social content". According to the scheme, a selected 30% of Class IX students are exchanged between two linked JNVs of different linguistic categories (generally between Hindi-speaking and non-Hindi-speaking states) for one year. During the migration period the three languages being taught to migrated students remain the same as in their parent JNV, but social and cultural exchanges are facilitated by their language learning in Class VI to IX. Initially migration was envisaged for students from Class IX to Class XII; it was reduced to two years (Class IX and Class X) in 1991–92. Finally in 1996-97 it was confined to only Class IX students.

Emulation of the Navodaya Vidyalaya system 
Emulating the concept of residential schools for talented children, Odisha State plans to set up one Odisha Adarsha Vidyalaya (OAV) (literally "Odisha Model School") at each of 314 block headquarters. 160 schools have already been launched. These Adarsha Vidyalayas would be CBSE-affiliated fully residential schools, provide free education, and target talented students through an annual entrance examination. These would have Class VI through Class XII and each class would have 80 students. These schools would be administered through Odisha Adarsha Vidyalaya Sangathan, a society registered under the Society Registration Act of Odisha.

Concerns over the care given to students 
Incidents of suicide among students and the lack of apparatus to engage with such issues concerning health and discrimination plague the schools. This has affected the Dalit and Tribal students more and there is no method in place to avoid such incidents. There is no system in place to report the cases of inadequate care and abuse by staff, much of attention from the school administration in the form of mundane bureaucratic procedures comes after the occurrence of violation.

Notable alumni

Notable alumni include:
Surendra Poonia, international award-winning sportsman and Limca book record holder
Hima Das, international athlete and gold medalist in Asian Games
C.K. Vineeth, India national football team member and Kerala Blasters player
V.T. Balram, MLA of Thrithala Constituency, Kerala 2011–2021
Dhananjay Kannoujia, current MLA of Belthara Road Constituency, Uttar Pradesh since March 2017
Dheeraj Singh Moirangthem, Indian Under-17 football team member and FC Goa player
Ummer Fayaz Parray, Indian Army officer who was abducted and killed in Kashmir
Lalit Prabhakar, Marathi actor
Ravi Bhatia, Indian television actor
Basharat Peer, Kashmiri American journalist
Pawandeep Rajan, Musician
Goddeti madavi, MP of Araku Constituency, AP
Sasikanth Manipatruni, notable scientist and inventor in the areas of electronics and computer engineering
Kalpana Kumari, AIR 1 (NEET, 2018)

Notes

References

External links

 NVS Official Website

Jawahar Navodaya Vidyalayas
Educational institutions established in 1986
1986 establishments in India